Mandahuaca (Mandawaka) is an Arawakan language of Venezuela and formerly of Brazil. The number of speakers is not known; the most recent data was published in 1975. It is one of several languages which goes by the generic name Baré.

Kaufman (1994) classified it in a Warekena group of Western Nawiki Upper Amazonian, Aikhenvald (1999) in Central (Orinoco) Upper Amazonian.

References

Languages of Venezuela
Arawakan languages